Becs, Bécs, BeCS or BECS may refer to:

 Bécs, the Hungarian name for Vienna, Austria
 Bio-energy with carbon capture and storage or bio-energy with carbon storage, a future greenhouse-gas mitigation technology
 Bécs (album), a 2014 album by Austrian guitarist and composer Fennesz
 Becs, title character in Dan & Becs, a 2007 Irish comedy television series 
 Becs de Bosson, a multi-summited mountain of the Pennine Alps
 Electoral Bloc of Communists and Socialists, a political alliance in Moldova

See also 
 Becks (disambiguation)
 Bec (disambiguation)
 BEC (disambiguation)
 Bex (disambiguation)